The 1954 NBA World Championship Series was the championship round of the 1954 NBA Playoffs, which concluded the National Basketball Association (NBA)'s 1953–54 season. The Western Division champion Minneapolis Lakers faced the Eastern Division champion Syracuse Nationals in a best-of-seven series with Minneapolis having home-court advantage. The Lakers won their third consecutive NBA championship and their fifth title in seven years dating from 1948, the club's final season as a member of the National Basketball League.

Minneapolis won game one and the teams thereafter alternated victories, with the Lakers winning the decisive game by a seven-point margin at home. The seven games were played in thirteen days, beginning Wednesday, March 31 and concluding Monday, April 12. The entire postseason tournament spanned 28 days in which both Minneapolis and Syracuse played 13 games.

Series summary

Lakers win series 4–3

Team rosters

Minneapolis Lakers

Syracuse Nationals
 3 King
 4 Schayes
 5 Seymour
 8 Osterkorn
 11 Lloyd
 12 Masino
 15 Kenville
 16 Lavoy
 17 Neal
 Coach Cervi

Television
Game two was the first NBA Finals contest to be carried live on national television, with the DuMont network providing the coverage. Game five was also aired by DuMont, featuring Marty Glickman doing play-by-play and Lindsey Nelson as the color analyst.

References

External links
 1954 Finals at NBA.com
 1954 NBA Playoffs at Basketball-Reference.com

National Basketball Association Finals
Finals
NBA
NBA Finals
NBA Finals
NBA
Basketball competitions in Minneapolis
1950s in Minneapolis
March 1954 sports events in the United States
April 1954 sports events in the United States
Basketball competitions in Syracuse, New York